This page shows the progress of Morecambe F.C. in the 2008–09 football season. During the season, Morecambe competed in League Two in the English league system. This would be Morecambe's second season in the Football League

League table

Results

Football League Two

FA Cup

League Cup

Football League Trophy

Players

First-team squad
Includes all players who were awarded squad numbers during the season.

Left club during season

References

Morecambe F.C. seasons
Morecambe